A spill of the leadership of the Liberal Party of Australia took place on 18 July 1987, following John Howard's loss in the 1987 federal election by previous leader Andrew Peacock. The spill was won by Howard against Peacock by 41 votes to 28.

Peacock was then elected deputy leader with 36 votes over Fred Chaney with 24, Michael MacKellar with 6 and John Moore with 3.

Background

Candidates
 John Howard, incumbent Leader, Member for Bennelong
 Andrew Peacock, former Leader, Member for Kooyong

Results

The following tables gives the ballot results:

Leadership ballot

Deputy leadership ballot

Other candidates in order of elimination:

 John Spender
 David Connolly
 Peter Shack
 Ian Wilson
 Neil Brown
 Harry Edwards
 Wilson Tuckey

Aftermath

References

Liberal Party of Australia leadership spills
July 1987 events in Australia
1987 elections in Australia
Liberal Party of Australia leadership spill